The 2001 FIA GT Monza 500 km was the first round the 2001 FIA GT Championship season.  It took place at the Autodromo Nazionale Monza, Italy, on March 31, 2001.

Official results
Class winners in bold.  Cars failing to complete 70% of winner's distance marked as Not Classified (NC).

Statistics
 Pole position – #7 Larbre Competition Chereau – 1:48.287
 Fastest lap – #1 Lister Storm Racing – 1:47.545
 Average speed – 148.420 km/h

References

 
 

M
Monza 500